Arcola is a city in Douglas County, Illinois, United States. The population was 2,927 at the 2020 census. The city was founded in 1855, when the Illinois Central Railroad was built through the county. The railroad itself was responsible for surveying, platting and founding the town.

History
Arcola was the birthplace in 1880 of John Barton Gruelle, or "Johnny" Gruelle, who created Raggedy Ann and Raggedy Andy, the loveable American dolls and storybook characters. He used artistic skills learned from his painter father, Richard Buckner Gruelle, combined with his self-taught writing skills to create stories expressing regional values and aesthetic images. His artistic granddaughter, Joni Gruelle Wannamaker, manages the Raggedy Ann Museum in Arcola.

A nationally known tourist attraction, Rockome Gardens, which featured large formal gardens, concrete fencing and architecture, and many Amish-influenced attractions was located just outside of Arcola. Rockome Gardens was built in 1937 and was operated for nearly 80 years by members of the local Old Order Amish community. In 2015, the Rockome Gardens property was sold to a local developer and has since been converted into Aikman Wildlife Adventure, a drive-through wildlife park which officially launched in 2016.

Arcola is also known for housing the world's only Hippie Memorial, created by Bob Moomaw, who died in 1998. He worked as a railroad clerk and tax assessor, but did not like either job. As an eccentric, independent artist with strong beliefs, he was able to give voice to his feelings, passions and opinions through his art and the writing on the sides of his buildings. He created the 62-foot-long artwork starting in 1992 to say something about his life and the era during which he lived. A nearby marker gives an interpretation of his work.

In the countryside surrounding nearby Arthur, Illinois, is a prominent community of Old Order Amish, the largest in Illinois. Amish farms occupy much of the farmland west of Arcola, with the highest concentration of Amish businesses around Arthur and the unincorporated communities of Chesterville, Bourbon, and Cadwell.  Arcola is home to the Illinois Amish Interpretive Center. The Old Order Amish Museum opened in 1996 and features exhibits on most aspects of Amish life, as well as an introductory video about the Central Illinois Amish. Through the museum, tours can be scheduled of the Amish countryside, Amish homes, farms, and businesses; meals in Amish homes can be scheduled as well.

Arcola is somewhat known for the Lawn Rangers, a "precision lawn mower drill team" that marches in formation with brooms and lawn mowers while wearing cowboy hats. Every year since 1980, the Lawn Rangers have marched in the Arcola Broom Corn Festival Parade. The event, held the weekend after Labor Day, honors Arcola's position in the late 19th century as a center of broom corn production. The Grand Marshal of the Parade in 1980 was Clayton Moore, famous as the Lone Ranger, and the team was named in his honor. This unique custom was publicized by humor columnist Dave Barry, who marched with the Lawn Rangers in 1995.

Arcola is also home to Libman Company. This mop and broom making company can boast to be the only major cleaning product company that manufactures their mops and brooms in America.   The nickname "broomtown" was given to Arcola because William Libman is a major employer of the city employing 600 people.

Geography

Arcola is located at  (39.683545, -88.305844).  US Route 45 & Illinois Route 133 run through the town.

Demographics
As of the 2020 census there were 2,927 people, 1,008 households, and 699 families residing in the city. The racial makeup of the city was 69.80% White, 0.31% African American, 0.61% Native American, 0.96% Asian, 0.03% Pacific Islander, 19.85% from other races, and 8.44% from two or more races. Hispanic or Latino of any race were 36.04% of the population.

There were 1,008 households, out of which 65.67% had children under the age of 18 living with them, 48.02% were married couples living together, 14.29% had a female householder with no husband present, and 30.65% were non-families. 24.31% of all households were made up of individuals, and 15.18% had someone living alone who was 65 years of age or older. The average household size was 3.17 and the average family size was 2.71.

The city's age distribution consisted of 26.3% under the age of 18, 11.1% from 18 to 24, 26.9% from 25 to 44, 21.3% from 45 to 64, and 14.5% who were 65 years of age or older. The median age was 35.5 years. For every 100 females, there were 86.5 males. For every 100 females age 18 and over, there were 88.6 males.

The median income for a household in the city was $60,720, and the median income for a family was $58,036. Males had a median income of $41,313 versus $27,574 for females. The per capita income for the city was $25,602. About 10.3% of families and 11.0% of the population were below the poverty line, including 15.1% of those under age 18 and 13.8% of those age 65 or over.

Notable people 

 Joseph Barricklow (1867–1924), Illinois lawyer and state legislator
Charles L. Craig (1872-1935), New York City Comptroller
 Jennie Garth (born 1972), best known for her role as Kelly Taylor in Beverly Hills, 90210
 Johnny Gruelle, (1880–1938) creator of the Raggedy Ann doll
 The Lawn Rangers, a "precision lawn mower drill team" that has participated in parades across the US
 H. M. Wicks, Herbert Moore "Harry" Wicks, founding member of the Communist Party of America, predecessor of the CPUSA History of the Communist Party USA

See also
 Arcola Carnegie Public Library
 Libman Company

References

External links

Arcola Community Unit School District #306
Arcola Chamber of Commerce
History of Arcola Township (written 1884)
A Walk Through Time Museum, Arcola, Illinois
Hippie Memorial
 The Illinois Amish Interpretive Center

Cities in Illinois
Cities in Douglas County, Illinois
Populated places established in 1855
Amish in Illinois
1855 establishments in Illinois